is an old-fashioned Japanese given name rarely used in modern Japan.

Real people
Kankurō Kudō, actor-screenwriter.
The kabuki actors known as Nakamura Kankurō, including:
Nakamura Kanzaburō XVIII, actor who previously known as Nakamura Kankurō V.
Saitō Dōsan, warrior and merchant, also known as Nishimura Kankurō Masatoshi.

Fictional characters
Kankuro (Naruto), a fictional character in the anime and manga series Naruto.

Japanese masculine given names